Luke Lake is a small lake in the municipality of Dysart et al, Haliburton County in Central Ontario, Canada. It is in the Ottawa River drainage basin.

Geography
The nearest named community is Kennaway,  to the east.

The primary inflow is an unnamed creek, arriving at the northwest. The primary outflow, at the southeast end of the lake, is an unnamed creek that flows to Fishtail Lake. Fishtail Lake flows via Allen Creek, Benoir Lake, the York River and the Madawaska River to the Ottawa River.

References

Lakes of Haliburton County